Hermann Lotter (7 March 1940 – 5 June 2013) was a German swimmer. He competed at the 1960 Summer Olympics and the 1964 Summer Olympics.

References

External links
 

1940 births
2013 deaths
German male swimmers
Olympic swimmers of the United Team of Germany
Swimmers at the 1960 Summer Olympics
Swimmers at the 1964 Summer Olympics
Universiade medalists in swimming
Sportspeople from Nuremberg
Universiade bronze medalists for West Germany
Medalists at the 1961 Summer Universiade
20th-century German people
21st-century German people